Virginia M. Barbour is a professor at Queensland University of Technology (QUT) in Brisbane, Australia, and serves as the Director of the Australasian Open Access Strategy Group. She is best known for being one of the three founding editors of PLOS Medicine, and her various roles in championing the open access movement.

Education 
Barbour pursued a Bachelor of Medicine, Bachelor of Surgery (MB BChir) degree and Master of Arts (MA) degree at the University of Cambridge. This was followed by a Doctor of Philosophy degree in molecular medicine at the University of Oxford where her research investigated the control of alpha globin genes and was awarded in 1997.

Career and research
Following her education and training, Barbour served as an executive editor at The Lancet between 1994 and 2004. Barbour was one of the three founding editors of PLOS Medicine (2004–2013), and later served as the PLOS Medicine Editorial Director (2012–2014), and the PLOS Medicine and Biology Editorial Director (2014–2015). Barbour has also served as a chair of the Committee on Publication Ethics (COPE) for two terms (2012–2015; 2015–2017). She serves as the director of the Australasian open access strategy group (2015–present), and works as a part-time professor between the Office of Research Ethics & Integrity and the Division of Technology, Information and Learning Services, at Queensland University of Technology (QUT) in Brisbane, Australia.

Barbour has published over 100 peer reviewed publications, generating over 14,000 citations and has an h-index of 20. She has played a role in developing several reporting guidelines and open-access initiatives, including Consolidated Standards of Reporting Trials (CONSORT), Preferred Reporting Items for Systematic Reviews and Meta-Analyses (PRISMA), Healthcare Information For All (HIFA) and Evidence AID.

Selected publications 
 Nephrotic syndrome associated with sulphasalazine
 UK Biobank: a project in search of a protocol?

 CONSORT 2010 statement: updated guidelines for reporting parallel group randomised trials
 CONSORT 2010 explanation and elaboration: updated guidelines for reporting parallel group randomised trials. 2012. International Journal of Surgery.
 Better reporting of interventions: template for intervention description and replication (TIDieR) checklist and guide
 Potential predatory and legitimate biomedical journals: can you tell the difference? A cross-sectional comparison

References

External links 

 Australasian Open Access Strategy Group

Academic staff of Queensland University of Technology
Australian medical researchers
Australian women academics
Australian women scientists
Open access activists
Living people
Year of birth missing (living people)